Rotterdam Centrum is a borough of Rotterdam. It was established on March 3, 2010. The center has 33,983 inhabitants (as of January 1, 2017).

Rotterdam Centrum is bounded by the emplacement of the Rotterdam Centraal railway station and the Goudsesingel in the North, the Tunneltraverse of the Henegouwerlaan and 's-Gravendijkwal in the West, the Nieuwe Maas River in the South and the Oostplein in the East.

Landmarks 
Some landmarks include:
Market Hall
Euromast
Beurstraverse (Koopgoot), with the Beurs-World Trade Center
Lijnbaan
Coolsingel with the city hall and Hofplein
Erasmusbrug
Willemsbrug
Various stations of the Rotterdam Metro
Grote of Sint-Laurenskerk
Library Rotterdam
Cube houses
The Schielandshuis

Neighborhoods 
The division into neighborhoods is as follows:
Oude Westen
Stadsdriehoek
Cool
C.S. kwartier
Nieuwe Werk (Scheepvaartkwartier)
Dijkzigt

References

External links 
 Official site

Rotterdam
Boroughs of Rotterdam
Centrum